Nisar Khan (born 20 September 1982) is an amateur Pakistani boxer who fights in the middleweight (75 kg) class.

His 2009 career included losing the opening bout of the World Boxing Championship, followed by a quarter-final defeat in the Asian Boxing Championship.

In the first ever China Open Boxing Championship in 2010 he also fell in the quarter-final round, this was repeated in 2011.

In 2010 he was chosen to be part of the Pakistan national team in the Commonwealth Games.

References

Living people
1982 births
Boxers at the 2010 Commonwealth Games
Boxers at the 2010 Asian Games
Pakistani male boxers
Asian Games competitors for Pakistan
Middleweight boxers
Commonwealth Games competitors for Pakistan